Zingg is a surname. Notable people with the surname include:

Adrian Zingg (1734–1816), Swiss painter
David Drew Zingg (1923–2000), American photographer and journalist
Drew Zingg (born 1957), American musician
Hans Zingg, Canadian professor
Jules-Émile Zingg (1882–1942), French painter
Monika Zingg (born 1943), Swiss figure skater
Silvan Zingg (born 1973), Swiss jazz pianist
Willy Zingg (died 1968), Swiss footballer